The Ramle Subdistrict was  one of the subdistricts of Mandatory Palestine. It was part of Lydda District of the British Mandate of Palestine. The sub-district's main city was Ramle. Its total population in 1944 was estimated at 123,490, of which 88,560 were Muslims; 29,420 were Jews; and 5,500 were Christians. A number of Palestinian Arab villages in the subdistrict were depopulated during the 1948 Palestine War, both by Jewish forces prior to the Israeli declaration of independence and after by Israeli forces. Following the war the area that had made up Ramla Subdistrict became a part of Israel's Central District, being mostly subdivided between a newly created Ramla Subdistrict and Rehovot Subdistrict.

Depopulated towns and villages

Abu al-Fadl
Abu Shusha
Ajanjul
Aqir
Barfiliya
al-Barriyya
Bashshit
Khirbat Bayt Far
Bayt Jiz
Bayt Nabala
Bayt Shanna
Bayt Susin
Bir Ma'in
Bir Salim
al-Burj
Khirbat al-Buwayra
Daniyal
Dayr Abu Salama
Dayr Ayyub
Dayr Muhaysin

Dayr Tarif
Khirbat al-Duhayriyya
al-Haditha
Idnibba
Innaba
Jilya
Jimzu
Kharruba
al-Khayma
Khulda
al-Kunayyisa
Latrun
Lydda
al-Maghar
Majdal Yaba
al-Mansura
al-Mukhayzin
al-Muzayri'a
al-Na'ani
Nabi Rubin
Qatra

Qazaza
al-Qubab
al-Qubayba
Qula
Ramle
Sajad
Salbit
Sarafand al-Amar
Sarafand al-Kharab
Saydun
Shahma
Shilta
al-Tina
al-Tira
Umm Kalkha
Wadi Hunayn
Yibna
Khirbat Zakariyya
Zarnuqa

References 

Subdistricts of Mandatory Palestine